Quercus Grove is an unincorporated community in Posey Township, Switzerland County, in the U.S. state of Indiana.

History
Quercus Grove was platted in 1816. An old variant name of the community was called Bark Works.

A post office was established at Quercus Grove in 1822, and remained in operation until it was discontinued in 1905.

Geography

References

Unincorporated communities in Switzerland County, Indiana
Unincorporated communities in Indiana